Nikolaos Persidis (Greek: Νικόλαος "Νίκος" Περσίδης; born September 8, 1995) is a Greek professional basketball player for Peristeri of the Greek Basket League. He is a 2.00 m (6'6 ") tall small forward.

Professional career
Persidis began his club career, while still being a student, in 2011, with the Greek club AGE Chalkida. In 2013, Ikaros Chalkidas's head coach Georgios Kalafatakis, picked him to join the team that year. In that season, the club played in Chalkida, instead of its regular home of Kallithea. Persidis then spent a season with the Greek club Psychiko. After that, he played with the Greek clubs Pagrati and Ionikos Nikaias. With Ionikos Nikaias, he started to receive major playing time. 

For the 2017–18 season, Persidis moved to Ethnikos Piraeus, which he helped to lead to the Greek 2nd division's playoffs. During that season, he appeared in 32 games, and he averaged 5.6 points and 4.3 rebounds, in 18 minutes played per game. In the following season, Persidis played with the Greek 2nd division club Diagoras Dryopideon. With Diagoras, he appeared in 29 games, and averaged 6.2 points and 4 rebounds, in 16.5 minutes played per game.

Persidis' performance with Diagoras was noticed by the coaching and scouting staff of the Greek EuroLeague club Panathinaikos. Eventually, Persidis joined the "Greens" team in the summer of 2019. He was primarily signed by the team to be used as an ancillary practice squad player, along with Kostas Papadakis, who would also have a similar role on the team.

On December 26, 2020, Persidis moved to Lavrio for the rest of the season. In 15 games, he averaged 2 points and 1.3 rebounds in under 10 minutes per contest. In 23 league games during the 2021-22 campaign, Persidis averaged an improved 4.5 points and 2.2 rebounds, playing around 15 minutes per contest.

On July 13, 2022, Persidis signed a one-year contract with AEK Athens. On December 15, 2022, Persidis' contract was terminated by mutual consent. Two days later, he signed with Peristeri for the rest of the season.

National team career
Persidis was selected to the Greek national 3x3 team for the 2018 Mediterranean Games, which took place in Tarragona, Spain.

References

External links
Eurobasket.com Profile
Greek Basket League Profile
Panathinaikos B.C. Profile

1995 births
Living people
AEK B.C. players
AGEH Gymnastikos B.C. players
Diagoras Dryopideon B.C. players
Ethnikos Piraeus B.C. players
Greek Basket League players
Greek men's basketball players
Ikaros B.C. players
Ionikos Nikaias B.C. players
Lavrio B.C. players
Pagrati B.C. players
Panathinaikos B.C. players
Peristeri B.C. players
Psychiko B.C. players
Small forwards
Sportspeople from Chalcis